A laetus was a foreigner permitted to settle in the Roman Empire.

Laetus may also refer to:

Quintus Aemilius Laetus (died 193), Roman prefect of the Praetorian Guard
Saint Laetus (died 553), hermit from Gaul
Julius Pomponius Laetus (1428–1498), Italian humanist